Jens Paeslack (born 25 February 1974) is a German former professional footballer played as a forward.

References

External links
 

1974 births
Living people
German footballers
Footballers from Hamburg
Association football forwards
2. Bundesliga players
Scottish Premier League players
Cypriot First Division players
VfB Lübeck players
Íþróttabandalag Vestmannaeyja players
Karlsruher SC players
St Mirren F.C. players
AEL Limassol players
Stuttgarter Kickers players
SV Sandhausen players
SSV Reutlingen 05 players
FC Sachsen Leipzig players
SV Waldhof Mannheim players
Kickers Emden players
German expatriate footballers
German expatriate sportspeople in Iceland
Expatriate footballers in Iceland
German expatriate sportspeople in Scotland
Expatriate footballers in Scotland
German expatriate sportspeople in Cyprus
Expatriate footballers in Cyprus